The Man on the Train is a 2002 French crime-drama film directed by Patrice Leconte, starring Jean Rochefort and Johnny Hallyday.  It was re-titled Man on the Train in the USA.

The film was shot in Annonay, France and won the audience awards at the Venice Film Festival for "Best Film" and "Best Actor" (Jean Rochefort) in 2002.

Though not an English-language film, the UK Film Council awarded £500,000 to assist its production.

Paramount Classics acquired the United States distribution rights of this film and gave it a limited US theatrical release on May 9, 2003 to a total of 85 theaters; this film went on to gross $2,542,020 in United States theaters, which is a solid result for a non-English language film. Paramount Classics was ecstatic with this film's performance in the United States market.

Plot
Milan (Hallyday) arrives in a small town by train at the start of the week. The hotel is closed, but he finds accommodation via a chance meeting with a retired French teacher, Manesquier (Rochefort). The film tells the story of the developing relationship between these apparent opposites, though looming in the background are two unavoidable events that each is expecting to take place on the Saturday – Manesquier is to undergo a triple heart bypass, and Milan (though he keeps this secret at first) is to take part in a bank robbery. Manesquier soon realises Milan's intentions, but this does not prevent a growing mutual respect, with each envying the other's lifestyle.

Cast
 Jean Rochefort : Monsieur Manesquier
 Johnny Hallyday : Milan
 Jean-François Stévenin : Luigi
 Édith Scob : Manesquier's sister
 Maurice Chevit : The hairdresser
 Riton Liebman : The strong man

English-language remake
In 2011 an English-language remake of this film was released, starring Donald Sutherland as the professor and Larry Mullen, Jr. as the thief.

References

External links

 
 

2002 films
2000s crime comedy-drama films
French crime comedy-drama films
Paramount Vantage films
Films directed by Patrice Leconte
Rail transport films
Films featuring a Best Actor Lumières Award-winning performance
2002 comedy films
2002 drama films
2000s French-language films
2000s French films